Middle-range theory can refer to theories in:
 Middle-range theory (archaeology), describes how people use objects and structures, and the human behaviors associated with this use
 Middle-range theory (sociology), a theory with limited scope, that explains a specific set of phenomena